Chapattimyidae is an extinct family of rodent from Asia. According to Fossilworks, it contains two subfamilies and six unplaced genera.

 Subfamily Baluchimyinae Flynn et al. 1986
 Asterattus Flynn and Cheema 1994
 Baluchimys Flynn et al. 1986 
 Lindsaya Flynn et al. 1986
 Lophibaluchia Flynn et al. 1986
 Wakkamys Flynn et al. 1986
 Zindapiria Flynn and Cheema 1994
 Subfamily Chapattimyinae Averianov 1996
 Khodzhentia Averianov 1996
 Terrarboreus Shevyreva 1971 
 Unplaced genera
 Basalomys Hartenberger 1982
 Birbalomys Sahni and Khare 1973
 Chapattimys Hussain et al. 1978
 Gumbatomys Hartenberger 1982
 Kazygurtia Nessov 1987 
 Subathumys Gupta and Kumar 2015

References 

Eocene mammals of Asia
Eocene rodents
Prehistoric rodent families